Lourdes Domínguez Lino and Arantxa Parra Santonja were the defending champions, but chose not to participate.
Kristina Mladenovic and Galina Voskoboeva won the title, defeating Petra Cetkovská and Iveta Melzer in the final, 6–3, 2–6, [10–5].

Seeds

  Julia Görges /  Anna-Lena Grönefeld (quarterfinals)
  Kristina Mladenovic /  Galina Voskoboeva (champions)
  Ashleigh Barty /  Marina Erakovic (withdrew because of Barty's illness)
  Caroline Garcia /  Oksana Kalashnikova (first round)

Draw

Draw

References
 Main Draw

2014 Abierto Mexicano Telcel